KLP may refer to:
Kommunal Landspensjonskasse, Norwegian mutual insurance company
KLP Eiendom, Norwegian real estate management company
KLP (musician), Australian singer-songwriter, record producer, DJ and radio personality
Kamasa language, ISO code klp
KLP or Key Lime Pie, early name for Android KitKat
Krishikar Lok Party, Indian political party in 1951